is an underground railway station on the Meikō Line in Minato-ku, Nagoya, Aichi Prefecture, Japan, operated by Nagoya Municipal Subway. It is numbered "E05".

Lines
Minato Kuyakusho Station is served by the Meikō Line, and lies 4.6 km from the terminus of the Meikō Line at Kanayama Station.

Layout
Minato Kuyakusho Station has two underground opposed side platforms. There is one set of ticket barriers, beyond which there are two exits. Each platform has an elevator, and Platform 1 for Nagoyakō Station has an up escalator and Platform 2 for Kanayama Station has a down escalator. Beyond the gates are two exits, Exit 1 and Exit 2. Near Exit 2 is a public telephone. There are universal access toilets with a baby changing area.

Platforms

On Platform 1 for Nagoyakō Station, train door 13 is closest to the elevator, door 12 is closest to the escalator, and doors 5 and 12 are closest to the stairs. On the opposite platform, Platform 2 for Kanayama Station, train door 14 is closest to the elevator and doors 7 and 14 are closest to the stairs.

History
Minato Kuyakusho Station was opened on 29 March 1971.

Surrounding area
This station provides access to its namesake, Minato-ku Ward Office, as well as a local library and a 24-hour post office.

References

External links

 Nagoya Transportation Bureau station information 

Railway stations in Japan opened in 1971
Railway stations in Aichi Prefecture
Stations of Nagoya Municipal Subway